Yaroslava Anatolyevna Pavlovich (born 2 November 1969, in Pinsk) is a Belarusian rowing cox.

References 
 
 

1969 births
Living people
Belarusian female rowers
Coxswains (rowing)
Sportspeople from Pinsk
Rowers at the 1996 Summer Olympics
Olympic bronze medalists for Belarus
Olympic rowers of Belarus
Olympic medalists in rowing
Medalists at the 1996 Summer Olympics